Patersonia, commonly known as native iris or native flag and are native to areas from Malesia to Australia.

Description
They are perennials with basal leaves growing from a woody rhizome that in some species extends above ground to form a short trunk.  The leaves are tough and fibrous, often with adaptations for conserving moisture, such as stomata sunk in grooves, a thickened cross-section, marginal hairs, and thickened margins. The flowers appear from between a pair of bracts on a leafless stem. They have three large outer tepals that are usually blue to violet, and three tiny inner tepals.  There are three stamens fused at the base to form a tube around the longer style, which bears a flattened stigma.

Taxonomy
The genus Patersonia was first formally described in 1807 by Robert Brown in the Botanical Magazine. The genus name is a tribute to the first Lieutenant Governor of New South Wales in Australia, William Paterson, "a gentleman whose name has been long familiar to the naturalist".

Species list
The following is a list of Patersonia species accepted by Plants of the World Online as of October 2021:
 Patersonia argyrea D.A.Cooke (W.A.)
 Patersonia babianoides Benth. (W.A.)
 Patersonia borneensis Stapf (Borneo)
 Patersonia drummondii F.Muell. ex Benth. – Drummond's patersonia (W.A.)
 Patersonia fragilis (Labill.) Asch. & Graebn. - swamp iris, short purple-flag (S.A., Qld., N.S.W., Vic., Tas.)
 Patersonia glabrata R.Br. - leafy purple flag, bugulbi (Qld., N.S.W., Vic.)
 Patersonia graminea Benth. – grass-leaved patersonia (W.A.)
 Patersonia inaequalis Benth. – unequal bract patersonia (W.A.)
 Patersonia inflexa Goldblatt (Papua New Guinea)
 Patersonia juncea Lindl. – rush-leaved patersonia (W.A.)
 Patersonia lanata R.Br. – woolly patersonia (W.A.)
 Patersonia limbata Endl. (W.A.)
 Patersonia lowii Stapf (Borneo)
 Patersonia macrantha Benth. (N.T.)
 Patersonia maxwellii (F.Muell.) F.Muell. ex Benth. (W.A.)
 Patersonia neocaledonica Goldblatt & J.C.Manning (New Caledonia)
 Patersonia novo-guineensis Gibbs (New Guinea)
 Patersonia occidentalis R.Br. (W.A., S.A., Vic., Tas.)
 Patersonia philippinensis Goldblatt (Mindoro)
 Patersonia pygmaea Lindl. (W.A.)
 Patersonia rudis Endl. (W.A.)
 Petersonia rudis Endl. subsp. rudis
 Petersonia rudis subsp. velutina D.A.Cooke
 Patersonia sericea R.Br. 
 Patersonia sericea var. longifolia (R.Br.) C.Moore – purple flag (N.S.W., Vic.)
 Patersonia sericea R.Br. var. sericea – silky purple-flag (Qld., N.S.W., Vic.)
 Patersonia spirafolia Keighery (W.A.)
 Patersonia sumatrensis Goldblatt (Sumatra)
 Patersonia umbrosa Endl. (W.A.)

References

 
Iridaceae genera